Kalyanpur, Goalpara is a village in Goalpara district of Assam state of India.

References

Villages in Goalpara district